The canton of Oloron-Sainte-Marie-2 is an administrative division of the Pyrénées-Atlantiques department, southwestern France. It was created at the French canton reorganisation which came into effect in March 2015. Its seat is in Oloron-Sainte-Marie.

It consists of the following communes:
 
Arudy
Aste-Béon
Béost
Bescat
Bielle
Bilhères
Buziet
Buzy
Castet
Eaux-Bonnes
Escou
Escout
Estialescq
Estos
Gère-Bélesten
Goès
Herrère
Izeste
Laruns
Lasseube
Lasseubetat
Ledeuix
Louvie-Juzon
Louvie-Soubiron
Lys
Ogeu-les-Bains
Oloron-Sainte-Marie (partly)
Poey-d'Oloron
Précilhon
Rébénacq
Sainte-Colome
Saucède
Sévignacq-Meyracq
Verdets

References

Cantons of Pyrénées-Atlantiques